BeWe TuusKi is a Finnish ice hockey team from Tuusula, Finland, playing in the Suomi-sarja league. It plays home games at the Talosyke Areena.

References

Ice hockey teams in Finland
Suomi-sarja teams
1994 establishments in Finland